In mathematics, Arakelyan's theorem is a generalization of Mergelyan's theorem from compact subsets of an open subset of the complex plane to relatively closed subsets of an open subset.

Theorem 
By Ω* is denoted the Alexandroff compactification of Ω.

Arakelyan's theorem states that for every f continuous in E and holomorphic in the interior of E and for every ε > 0 there exists g holomorphic in Ω such that |g − f| < ε on E if and only if Ω* \ E is connected and locally connected.

See also 
 Runge's theorem
 Mergelyan's theorem

References 

 
 
 

Theorems in complex analysis
Theorems in approximation theory